Kunado-no-Kami, alternately Kunato-no-Kami, Funado-no-Kami, Funato-no-Kami, or Chimata-no-Kami, are Japanese local gods connected chiefly with protection against disaster and malicious spirits.

The term "Kunado-no-Kami" and its variants are derived ultimately from  ku-na-do, meaning a place that is not to be entered, a taboo or sacred space. These kami are regarded as protecting the boundaries of a village and forestalling entry by malicious or harmful spirits and influences, thereby preventing disasters. A common origin myth connects them with the fundoshi cast aside by Izanagi upon his return from the underworld as recorded in the Kojiki.

In some cases the protection of these kami extends to roads and paths, in which capacity the variant name Chimata-no-Kami is particularly likely to be applied.

See also
 Mishaguji

References

Japanese gods
Shinto kami